Owen-Harrison House is a historic plantation house located near Mill Bridge, Rowan County, North Carolina.  It was built in 1843, and is a -story, four bay, double pile brick dwelling with Federal/Greek Revival-style design elements. The front facade has a restored one-story pedimented porch and there are two chimneys on each gable end.

It was listed on the National Register of Historic Places in 1983.

References

Plantation houses in North Carolina
Houses on the National Register of Historic Places in North Carolina
Federal architecture in North Carolina
Greek Revival houses in North Carolina
Houses completed in 1843
Houses in Rowan County, North Carolina
National Register of Historic Places in Rowan County, North Carolina
1843 establishments in North Carolina